Lady Joan Margaret Legge JP (1885–1939) was an English botanist who had a fatal accident while collecting samples in the Valley of Flowers in India.

Early life
Legge was born on 21 February 1885 to William Legge, 6th Earl of Dartmouth, and Lady Mary Coke. She held the office of Justice of Peace for Staffordshire.

Death

In 1939 Legge went to India to study flora in the Valley of Flowers on behalf of the Royal Botanic Gardens, Kew. While traversing some rocky slopes to collect flowers, she slipped off and lost her life. She died unmarried at the age of 54. 

Legge's sister came in search of her and built a tomb in the Valley of Flowers.

Commemoration
In 2010 a new species of Impatiens found near the Valley of Flowers was named Impatiens leggei as a tribute to Legge.

References

1885 births
1939 deaths
Accidental deaths from falls
Accidental deaths in India
Daughters of British earls
Joan Margaret